Dominican Republic competed in the 2019 Pan American Games in Lima, Peru from July 26 to August 11, 2019.

On July 2, 2019, weightlifter Crismery Santana was named as the country's flag bearer during the opening ceremony.

The Dominican Republic team consisted of 209 athletes.

Medalists

The following Dominican Republic competitors won medals at the games.

|  style="text-align:left; width:78%; vertical-align:top;"|

|  style="text-align:left; width:26%; vertical-align:top;"|

Competitors
The following is the list of number of competitors (per gender) participating at the games per sport/discipline.

Archery

Women

Badminton

The Dominican Republic qualified a team of six badminton athletes (three per gender).

Men
3 quotas

Women
3 quotas

Baseball

The Dominican Republic qualified a men's team of 24 athletes by finishing in the top four at the 2019 Pan American Games Qualifier in Brazil.

Group A

Beach volleyball

The Dominican Republic qualified a men's pair.

Men
1 Pair (2 athletes)

Bodybuilding

The Dominican Republic qualified a male bodybuilder.

There were no results in the pre-judging stage, with only the top six advancing.

Bowling

Boxing

The Dominican Republic qualified 11 boxers (nine men and two women).

Men

Women

Canoeing

Sprint

Men

Qualification legend: QF – Qualify to final; SF – Qualify to semifinal

Diving

Men

Equestrian

Dominican Republic qualified five equestrians.

Dressage

Jumping

Fencing

The Dominican Republic qualified a team of 4 female fencers.

Women
Épée – 1 quota
Sabre – 3 quotas

Golf

The Dominican Republic qualified a full team of four golfers (two men and two women).

Gymnastics

Trampoline
The Dominican Republic qualified a one female trampolinist.

Karate

Modern pentathlon

The Dominican Republic qualified four modern pentathletes (two men and two women).

Men
2 quotas

Women
2 quotas

Racquetball

The Dominican Republic qualified four racquetball athletes (two men and two women).

Men
2 quotas

Women
2 quotas

Sailing

Dominican Republic has qualified 1 boat for a total of 1 sailor.

Open

Shooting

Men

Women

Mixed

Table tennis

Men

Women

Mixed

Taekwondo

Kyorugi (sparring)
Men

Women

Tennis

Men

Women

Mixed

Volleyball

The Dominican Republic qualified a women's team (of 12 athletes) by winning the silver medal at the 2018 Women's Pan-American Volleyball Cup.

Summary

Women's tournament 

Group stage

Semifinal

Gold medal match

Water skiing

Water skiing
Men

Women

Weightlifting

The Dominican Republic qualified eight weightlifters (four men and four women).

Men

Women

Wrestling

Men

References

Nations at the 2019 Pan American Games
2019
2019 in Dominican Republic sport